Southern Ndebele, also known as Transvaal Ndebele or South Ndebele, is an African language belonging to the Nguni group of Bantu languages, spoken by the Ndebele people of South Africa.

There is also a different language called Northern Ndebele or Northern Transvaal Ndebele also known as  isiNdebele seNyakatho or simply siNdebele, spoken in Limpopo in areas such as Polokwane (Bhulungwane), Ga-Rathoka (KaSontronga), Ga-Mashashane, Kalkspruit, Mokopane (Mghumbane), Zebediela (Sebetiela), which is closer to Southern Ndebele.

Overview

The Southern Transvaal Ndebele people's history has been traced back to King Ndebele, King Ndebele fathered King Mkhalangana, King Mkhalangana fathered King Mntungwa (not to be confused with the Khumalo Mntungwa, because he was fathered by Mbulazi), King Mntungwa fathered King Jonono, King Jonono fathered King Nanasi, King Nanasi fathered King Mafana, king Mafana fathered King Mhlanga and Chief Libhoko, King Mhlanga fathered King Musi and Chief Skhube.

Ndebele – Some of his sons were left behind with the Hlubi tribe
Mkhalangana – Some of his sons branched north and formed the Kalanga tribe
Mntungwa – Founder of the amaNtungwa clan
Njonono – He died in Jononoskop near Ladysmith – Surname Jonono is in the Hlubi tribe
Nanasi – He died in Jononoskop near Ladysmith – Surname Nanasi is in the Hlubi tribe
Mafana – He died in Randfontein (Emhlangeni)
Mhlanga – He died in Randfontein (Emhlangeni)
Musi – He died in kwaMnyamana (Pretoria)

King Musi's kraal was based at eMhlangeni a place named after his father Mhlanga, the name of the place is currently known as Randfontein (Mohlakeng) and later moved to KwaMnyamana which is now called Emarula or Bon Accord in Pretoria. King Musi was a polygamist and fathered the following sons, Skhosana (Masombuka), Manala (Mbuduma), Ndzundza (Hlungwana), Thombeni (Kekana or Gegana), Sibasa, Mhwaduba (Lekhuleni) and Mphafuli and others.

Southern Transvaal Ndebele is one of the eleven official languages in the Republic of South Africa. The language is a Nguni or Zunda classification (UN) spoken mostly in the Mpumalanga Province, Gauteng, Limpopo and the Northwest.

The expression isikhethu can be loosely translated to mean 'the Southern Ndebele way of doing or saying'. Isikhethu means Southern Ndebele in the same way that sikitsi will mean Swazi and se harona will mean Sotho.

The language has been severely marginalised over the years. Until the formation of the apartheid Southern Ndebele homeland (KwaNdebele), speaking the language publicly was discouraged. Most Southern Transvaal Ndebele speakers preferred Zulu especially because the latter was learned at school. Today the Southern Ndebele speakers, mostly those who are educated still prefer to use Southern Ndebele as home language for their children and will use Southern Ndebele as a language to communicate with other Southern Ndebele speakers.

Phonology

Vowels

Consonants 

Click consonants

Grammar

Nouns

The Southern Ndebele noun consists of two essential parts, the prefix and the stem. Using the prefixes, nouns can be grouped into noun classes, which are numbered consecutively, to ease comparison with other Bantu languages.

The following table gives an overview of Southern Ndebele noun classes, arranged according to singular-plural pairs.

1 umu- replaces um- before monosyllabic stems, e. g. umuntu (person).

Verbs

Verbs use the following affixes for the subject and the object:

Examples
Months in Southern Ndebele

AmaNdebele in Zimbabwe
Zimbabwean Ndebele is part of the Nguni cluster and is therefore very similar to other Nguni languages (such as Zulu, Xhosa and Swati) with which it shares a high level of mutual intelligibility. The South African (or Southern Transvaal Ndebele), while maintaining its Nguni roots, has been influenced by the Sotho languages.

References

External links

 List links to Ndebele language resources

Software
 Spell checker for OpenOffice.org and Mozilla, OpenOffice.org, Mozilla Firefox web-browser, and Mozilla Thunderbird email program in Ndebele
 Project to translate Free and Open Source Software into Ndebele

 
Nguni languages
Languages of South Africa